"Never" is a single by American singer Jaheim. It was written by Jaheim along with Emmanuell Chisolm, Daniel Farris, and Davion Farris for his fourth studio album The Making of a Man, while production was helmed by Daniel Farris of WoodWorks Records. It peaked at number one US Adult R&B Songs chart.

Charts

Weekly charts

Year-end charts

References

2008 singles
Jaheim songs
2008 songs